Thomas ("Tim") Borstelmann (born 4 April 1958) is an American historian.
He is currently the Elwood N. and Katherine Thompson Distinguished Professor of History at the University of Nebraska.

Life 

He was born on 4 April 1958.  He graduated from the Phillips Exeter Academy. He completed his B.A. degree from Stanford University. He completed his M.A. and Ph.D. from Duke University. He taught at Cornell University from 1991 to 2003. He served as President of the Society for Historians of American Foreign Relations (SHAFR) in 2015.

Bibliography 

 The Cold War and the Color Line: American Race Relations in the Global Arena 
 The 1970s: A New Global History from Civil Rights to Economic Inequality 
 Apartheid's Reluctant Uncle: The United States and Southern Africa in the Early Cold War 
 Created Equal: A History of the United States
 Just Like Us: The American Struggle to Understand Foreigners

References

External links
 

21st-century American historians
21st-century American male writers
Living people
1958 births
Duke University alumni
University of Nebraska faculty
American male non-fiction writers